Darren Holloway (born 3 October 1977 in Bishop Auckland, England) is a retired professional footballer. His former clubs include Bradford City (scoring once against Hull), Wimbledon, Scunthorpe United (scoring once against Yeovil), Sunderland and Darlington (scoring once against Lincoln City). In October 2008, he joined Gateshead, having been out of the game since he was released by Darlington at the end of the 2006–07 season.
He was released by Gateshead after the 2008–09 season.

References

External links

1977 births
Living people
English footballers
Sunderland A.F.C. players
Carlisle United F.C. players
Bolton Wanderers F.C. players
Wimbledon F.C. players
Scunthorpe United F.C. players
Bradford City A.F.C. players
Darlington F.C. players
Gateshead F.C. players
Premier League players
English Football League players
National League (English football) players
Association football defenders